The following is a list of devices running the Android TV operating system developed by Google.

Commercial devices
Chromecast with Google TV
Nexus Player (discontinued)
Nvidia Shield TV
Mediabox Maverick (South Africa)
Razer Forge TV (discontinued)
Xiaomi TV, Xiaomi Mi Box, Mi Box S, Mi TV Stick, and Xiaomi TV Stick 4K
Nokia Streaming Box, and Nokia Media Streamer (Europe)
Walmart Onn Android TV Box
Realme 4K Smart Google TV Stick and 1080p Smart Android TV Stick (India)
Akari SMARTBOX (Indonesia)
Dynalink Android TV Box

Devices provided by pay TV operators
TVB MyTV SUPER Box (Hong Kong)
TVB Anywhere Android TV Box
Polytron Mola Streaming, and PLAY 2 4K Smart Android TV Box (Indonesia)
IndiHome (Indonesia)
First Media (Indonesia)
MNC Play Vision+ TV (Indonesia)
Nex Parabola NexVidio (Indonesia)
StarHub Go Streaming Box, and StarHub TV+ Box (Singapore)
Verizon Stream TV
TiVo Stream 4K
Foxtel Now Box (Australia)
Vodafone TV (Australia) (discontinued)
Tata Play binge+ (India)
Airtel Xstream Box, Xstream Stick, and Internet TV (India)
DishSMRT Hub (India)
d2h Stream (India)
Globe Streamwatch 2-in-1 Entertainment Box, and Globe Xtreme Prepaid (Philippines)
Sky EVO (Philippines)
Converge VISION Xperience Box (Philippines)
Proximus Android TV Box (Belgium)
unifi Plus Box (Malaysia)

Notes

References

Android (operating system) devices